The girls' big air event in freestyle skiing at the 2020 Winter Youth  Olympics took place on 21 and 22 January at the Leysin Park & Pipe.

Qualification
The qualification was held on 21 January at 10:30.

Final
The final was held on 22 January at 11:50.

References

Girls' big air